Chrysocolaptes is a genus of birds in the woodpecker family Picidae that are found in South and Southeast Asia.

The genus was introduced by  English zoologist Edward Blyth in 1843. The type species was subsequently designated as the Javan flameback (Chrysocolaptes strictus) by Scottish ornithologist Edward Hargitt in 1890. The genus name combines the Ancient Greek khrusos meaning "gold" and kolaptēs meaning "chiseller". The genus belongs to the tribe Campephilini in the subfamily Picinae and is sister to the orange-backed woodpecker, the only species in the genus Reinwardtipicus.

Species
The genus contains these nine species:

References

 
Bird genera
Taxa named by Edward Blyth